Montezuma Township is located in Pike County, Illinois. As of the 2010 census, its population was 540 and it contained 254 housing units.

It is located in Township 6 South, Range 2 West of the 3rd Principal Meridian.  Villages include Bedford, Greenpond, Milton and Montezuma.

Geography

Demographics

References

External links
City-data.com
Illinois State Archives
Illinois GenWeb

Townships in Pike County, Illinois
Townships in Illinois